Philodendron melanochrysum is a species of flowering plant in the family Araceae, endemic to the wet Andean foothills of Colombia, growing at approximately 500m above sea level in the provinces of Chocó and Antioquia but widely cultivated elsewhere as an ornamental.

The name suffix "melanochrysum" means "black gold" and refers to "tiny golden sparkles" sometimes observed when the leaves of the adult plant (which are dark, almost black) are in sunlight. It has been in cultivation outside of South America since at least 1886, exhibited to Europeans via Veitch Nurseries by Messrs Veitch & Son under the synonym Philodendron andreanum as follows:  

The species has heart-shaped leaves that are typically 25 cm long, but can in ideal conditions grow much longer. Emerging leaves have a copper-gold velvety sheen, but when established become blackish-green with pale green veins. Growing them up a moss pole and maintaining high humidity ensures ideal development. Philodendron melanochrysum may be susceptible to a variety of pests, in particular spider mites.

References

melanochrysum
Endemic flora of Colombia
Plants described in 1873
Taxa named by Jean Jules Linden
Taxa named by Édouard André